Arthur Hinchliffe (26 August 1897 – 1960) was an English footballer who played for Rochdale

References

Rochdale A.F.C. players
English footballers
1897 births
1960 deaths
Footballers from Bolton
Association footballers not categorized by position